The Chevrolet Traverse is a full-size crossover SUV with three-row seating built by General Motors. It is built on the same platform as the GMC Acadia and Buick Enclave, known as the Lambda platform for first generation, and the C1XX for second generation. It also shares the C1XX platform with the Cadillac XT6. It is the successor to the TrailBlazer body-on-frame SUV and Uplander minivan.

The second generation model debuted in showrooms in the summer of 2017. Starting with the 2019 model year, the Traverse was slotted above the new mid-size Chevrolet Blazer as part of Chevrolet's plans to expand its SUV lineup.

The Traverse name was originally used for a concept car at the 2003 North American International Auto Show in Detroit, but that concept gave way when the Equinox launched for the 2005 model year.

Powertrain 
The Chevrolet Traverse features the LLT engine, a  DOHC V6 with VVT and direct injection. The other Lambda-based vehicles also have this powertrain in the 2009 model year.  A 6-speed automatic transmission gives power to the front or all wheels.  The Traverse delivers  with the torque at 266 lb·ft. in the LS and LT models. The LTZ model, with dual exhaust, delivers  and the torque comes in at 270 lb·ft. The Traverse received a 2.0-liter 4-cylinder turbo engine for the 2018 model year (RPO code LTG), available only on the RS trim level. The 2.0L 4-cylinder Turbo engine was short-lived, with Chevrolet discontinuing the engine for the Traverse in April 2019.  2018 also saw an updated 3.6-liter V6 engine (RPO code LFY). The updated 3.6-liter engine features increased power, and engine start-stop technology. Starting for the 2018 model year, A 9-speed 9T65 transmission was used across all trim levels and engine options.

Marketing 

The Traverse was part of a product placement by GM in the NBC drama My Own Worst Enemy, along with the new Chevrolet Camaro; the show was cancelled in mid-November 2008. The vehicle also appears on the remake of Hawaii Five-0 and The Mentalist.

The Traverse is also used in the Minnie Van Service in conjunction with Lyft at the Walt Disney World Resort in Florida.

Gothic black colors of the Chevrolet Traverse are commonly used by federal agencies, such as Secret Service.

First generation (2009) 

The 2009 Chevrolet Traverse debuted at the 2008 Chicago Auto Show and the Traverse had arrived at every Chevrolet dealer in October 2008. The first Traverse was built at GM's Spring Hill, Tennessee, assembly plant during 2009, until its production was moved to GM's Delta Township, Michigan assembly plant in 2010.

The production Traverse's design was inspired by the 2005 Chevrolet Sequel concept, and has a chevron-shaped grille similar to the 2008 Chevrolet Malibu. The Traverse has unique sheet metal different from the other Lambda crossovers, with the exception of the doors.

2010
On the LT models, the early 2010 update removed the "TRAVERSE" badges on the front doors. Beginning on late 2010 models, the GM logos were removed from the vehicle's front doors.

2013 facelift 
A facelift of the Chevrolet Traverse was unveiled at the 2012 New York International Auto Show. The 2013 Traverse receives a new grille and front fascia, a redesigned rear liftgate, and reworked Camaro-inspired tail lights, and the transmission has been reworked for improved shift quality and timing. Pictures were released by GM on March 28, 2012. Chevrolet's new color touchscreen and MyLink radios are standard, as well as wood interior trim. Both cloth and leather seating surfaces will be available, depending on the model. Cloth is standard on the LS and 1LT models, and leather is standard on the LTZ. Both are available on the 2LT model. Some new wheels will be available, and models will continue to be offered in both front-wheel drive and all-wheel drive versions, ranging from the base LS to the top-of-the-line LTZ. A Bose audio system will be standard on 2LT and LTZ models.

2014
While there were no cosmetic changes made for the 2014 model year, Chevrolet did add new features to the Traverse: Forward Collision Alert and Lane Departure Warning.  Also, the audio system feature was updated, with a dual charge USB port now located at the rear of the center console.

2015
No cosmetic changes. Only two new features, a revised 18-inch wheel appearance and Siri Eyes Free, were added. Siren Red Tintcoat, Sable Metallic, and Blue Velvet Metallic became available as exterior colors, while Ebony/Saddle Up became available as an interior color option.

2016
The 2016 Traverse received minor changes. The trim level were reduced to LS, LT1, LT2, and LTZ. New features include OnStar 4G LTE connectivity with Wi-Fi hotspot, Iridescent Pearl and Mosaic Black Metallic as color palettes, Leather and Driver Confidence Packages for the LT trims, and 20-inch aluminum wheel designs, painted and machined finishes.

2017
For the 2017 model year, the Traverse LTZ trim is renamed to Premier. However, most of the features from the 2016 model year Traverse had been carried over to the 2017 Traverse models.

Safety

1 vehicle structure rated "Good"
2 strength-to-weight ratio: 4.00

Second generation (2018)

On January 23, 2017, General Motors unveiled the second generation Traverse at the 2017 North American International Auto Show in Detroit. Introduced as a 2018 model, it went on sale in July 2017. While Chevrolet is making the vehicle available in North America, plans include expanding the Traverse to the Middle East, and selected South American countries. The Traverse was launched to the Russian market in 2018, and was sold in South Korea in the second half of 2019, where it is touted as a "Super SUV" and its largest Crossover SUV in that region.

The updated Traverse adopted a more truck-like design, similar to the Tahoe, while taking some cues from the now mid-size Acadia, with the Chevrolet front grille design. It remains an 8-seat (or 7-seat optional) passenger vehicle.

There are 5 trim levels available for the 2nd generation Traverse: L, LS, LT, Premier, and High Country (see below for trim level content). All the trim levels are available in either Front Wheel Drive (FWD) or All Wheel Drive (AWD) drive type configurations except for the L trim level which is only available in FWD and the High Country trim level which is only available in AWD. In an addition, there are 2 types of AWD system available for this generation of Traverse: the standard AWD system that allows user to disconnect the prop-shaft until rear traction is needed and the twin-clutch Twinster version (available only with High Country trim) with two rear clutches to more directly apply torque to the rear wheel that needs it most, both are developed by GKN Driveline.

At the introductory period, a 310-horsepower 3.6L V6 gasoline engine was one of two engine options available, mated to a nine-speed automatic transmission with either Front Wheel Drive or All Wheel Drive. a 2.0L Turbocharged Inline 4 was the other available engine, but that could only be optioned in RS Front Wheel Drive models from 2017-2019.

The new Traverse gained some new technology, some of which is currently available on other models such as the Chevrolet Equinox, Chevrolet Tahoe, and Chevrolet Suburban. Some of this technology included: a hands-free power tailgate, the latest-generation Chevrolet MyLink infotainment systems with standard Apple CarPlay and Android Auto, a power-folding 60/40 split third-row rear bench seat, and standard keyless access with push-button start.

Trim levels 

The second-generation Chevrolet Traverse is offered in several different trim levels (all of which are available in front-wheel drive (FWD) or all-wheel drive (AWD), except for the base L, which is only available with FWD, and the top-of-the-line High Country, which is only available with AWD), and each offering their own distinct level of standard equipment:

Model year changes 
For 2019 model year, the Blackout Package was added as an available option on LS, LT, and Premier trim levels. The 2.0L I4 turbo engine (exclusive to the RS trim level) was discontinued for the 2020 model year (starting midway through the 2019 model year). Also, the MyLink system was replaced by the Infotainment 3 system and a buckle-to-drive feature was added to the Teen Driver system. For the 2021 model year, the optional rear seat infotainment (which was available on LT, RS, Premier, Redline Edition, and High Country trim levels) was discontinued on the Traverse.

2022 facelift 
Originally planned for the 2021 model year, Chevrolet gave the Traverse a refreshed look for 2022, adopting a grille similar to the redesigned Suburban/Tahoe vehicles, and featuring thin LED headlights and taillights, plus new daytime running lights with integrated LED turn signals. Also new are interior seating options, wireless Apple CarPlay and Android Auto, and a new available eight-inch infotainment display. Several safety features are now standard: Automatic Emergency Braking, Front Pedestrian Braking, Forward Collision Alert, Lane Keep Assist with Lane Departure Warning, IntelliBeam auto high beams, and a Following Distance Indicator. Advanced Adaptive Cruise Control is added to the 3LT, RS and Premier trims, while GM's Safety Alert Seat is now standard on Premier and High Country models. These changes were based on feedback from consumers. 

The updated Traverse was to go on sale in late 2020, but was delayed due to production issues caused by the COVID-19 outbreak.  It went on sale in late 2021 as a 2022 model instead. The 2022 Traverse retained the 3.6-liter V6 gasoline engine with the 9-speed automatic transmission.

Sales

References

External links 

 

Traverse
Cars introduced in 2008
2010s cars
2020s cars
Full-size sport utility vehicles
Mid-size sport utility vehicles
Crossover sport utility vehicles
Front-wheel-drive vehicles
All-wheel-drive vehicles
Motor vehicles manufactured in the United States
Vehicles built in Lansing, Michigan